Betzabeth Rebecca Sarco Colmenarez (born 26 April 1994) is a Venezuelan freestyle wrestler.

Career 

In 2015, she represented Venezuela at the Pan American Games in Toronto, Canada and she competed in the 58kg event where she was eliminated in her first match by Yanet Sovero. Sovero went on to win one of the bronze medals. Later that year, Sarco competed in the 58kg event at the 2015 World Wrestling Championships held in Las Vegas, United States where she was eliminated in her first match by Tetyana Lavrenchuk of Ukraine.

In 2018, she won one of the bronze medals in the 57kg event at the South American Games held in Cochabamba, Bolivia.

At the 2020 Pan American Wrestling Championships held in Ottawa, Canada, she won one of the bronze medals in the 57kg event. She also competed in the 2020 Pan American Wrestling Olympic Qualification Tournament, also held in Ottawa, Canada, without qualifying for the 2020 Summer Olympics in Tokyo, Japan. She also failed to qualify for the Olympics at the World Olympic Qualification Tournament held in Sofia, Bulgaria.

Achievements

References

External links 
 

Living people
1994 births
Place of birth missing (living people)
Venezuelan female sport wrestlers
Pan American Games competitors for Venezuela
Wrestlers at the 2015 Pan American Games
South American Games medalists in wrestling
Competitors at the 2018 South American Games
South American Games bronze medalists for Venezuela
Pan American Wrestling Championships medalists
21st-century Venezuelan women